Bidak (also Romanized as Bīdak) is a village in Meyami Rural District, Razaviyeh District, Mashhad County, Razavi Khorasan Province, Iran. At the 2006 census, its population was 116, in 31 families.

References 

Populated places in Mashhad County